The Victoria men’s cricket team is an Australian first-class men's cricket team based in Melbourne, Victoria. The men’s team, which first played in 1851, represents the state of Victoria in the Marsh Sheffield Shield first-class competition and the Marsh One Day Cup 50-over competition. 

It was known as the Victorian Bushrangers between 1995 and 2018, before dropping the Bushrangers nickname and electing to be known as simply Victoria in all cricket competitions. Victoria shares home matches between the Melbourne Cricket Ground in East Melbourne and the Junction Oval in St Kilda. The team is administered by Cricket Victoria and draws its players primarily from Victoria's Premier Cricket competition along with players from throughout the country. Victoria also played in the now-defunct Twenty20 competition, the Twenty20 Big Bash, which was replaced by the franchise-based Big Bash League.

The Victorian cricket team is the second-most successful state team in Australian first-class cricket, having won 32 Sheffield Shield titles, the most recent of which was in the 2018–19 season. The Victorians have also claimed six One-Day Cups and four Big Bash tiles.

History 

The team's origins date back to the very start of Australian cricket when the Melbourne Cricket Club (MCC) was formed in 1838, and in that same year an MCC team played its first match against the Victorian Military. However, the first official inter-colonial (now interstate) game was contested between Port Phillip and Van Diemen's Land in 1851, in Launceston.

Victoria was the dominant force in the early days of Australian first-class cricket, winning two of the first three Sheffield Shield tournaments, and most of its early domestic friendly games against the other states. The first game between the great rivals Victoria and New South Wales was played at the Melbourne Cricket Ground (MCG) in 1856.

The annual Sheffield Shield tournament first began in the 1892/93 season, contested by Victoria, New South Wales and South Australia. Victoria won that tournament by defeating both opponents twice each. During the history of the Shield, Victoria has won the competition 32 times, most recently in the 2018/19 season.

The Victorian Cricket Association, now Cricket Victoria, was founded in 1895 and since March 2018 has been based at its headquarters, the CitiPower Centre in St Kilda.

Victoria has featured a significant number of cricketing greats, such as Warwick Armstrong, Bill Woodfull, Bill Ponsford, Neil Harvey, Hugh Trumble, Lindsay Hassett, Dean Jones, Jack Blackham, Jack Ryder, Bill Lawry, Bob Cowper, Shane Warne, Keith Miller and Ian Redpath. (See
here for a full listing of past players).

Victoria has been a powerful force in Australian cricket and the Australian cricket team has, at least until recent decades, never been short of Victorians in the line up.

The tradition of starting a cricket match at the MCG on Boxing Day also featured Victoria when they played New South Wales in 1965.

Victoria is the only first-class cricket team to have scored over 1,000 in an innings, which it achieved twice in the 1920s – 1,023 against Tasmania in 1922–23, and 1,107 against New South Wales in 1926–27.

Identity
Throughout its history, Victoria's dominant colour has been navy blue, either in full when playing One-Day or Twenty20 competitions or on predominantly white kits in first-class cricket. The team logo replicates that of Cricket Victoria and has done so since the organisation chose to cease referring to the Bushrangers nickname when describing the men's team. The current major sponsor of the team is the CitiPower.

Squad
Squad for the 2022/23 domestic season. Players with international caps are listed in bold.

Source:

Honours
Sheffield Shield Titles – (32): 1892/93, 1894/95, 1897/98, 1898/99, 1900/01, 1907/08, 1914/15, 1921/22, 1923/24, 1924/25, 1927/28, 1929/30, 1930/31, 1933/34, 1934/35, 1936/37, 1946/47, 1950/51, 1962/63, 1966/67, 1969/70, 1973/74, 1978/79, 1979/80, 1990/91, 2003/04, 2008/09, 2009/10, 2014/15, 2015/16, 2016/17, 2018/19.
National One Day Cup Titles – (6): 1971/72, 1979/80, 1994/95, 1998/99, 2010/11, 2018/19.
KFC Twenty20 Big Bash Titles1 – (4): 2005/06, 2006/07, 2007/08, 2009/10
1 Now defunct competition

Records

First Class Batting Records for Victoria 

First Class Bowling Records for Victoria

List A Batting Records for Victoria

List A Bowling Records for Victoria

See also 
Cricket Victoria
Cricket Australia
List of Victoria first-class cricketers
Victoria women's cricket team

References

External links 
 Official Website of the Victorian cricket team
 Official Website of Cricket Australia

Cricket clubs established in 1851
Australian first-class cricket teams
Cricket in Victoria (Australia)
cricket
1851 establishments in Australia